is a private Catholic girls' junior and senior high school in Fujisawa, Kanagawa Prefecture, Japan.

 this school has about 1,100 students originating from Kanagawa Prefecture and Tokyo.

References

External links
 Shonan Shirayuri Gakuen Junior High School and High School 

Schools in Kanagawa Prefecture
Girls' schools in Japan
High schools in Kanagawa Prefecture
Private schools in Japan